Partial general elections were held in Belgium on 12 June 1866. In the elections for the Chamber of Representatives the result was a victory for the Liberal Party, which won 70 of the 122 seats. Voter turnout was 70%, although only 51,465 people were eligible to vote.

Under the alternating system, elections were only held in four out of the nine provinces: Hainaut, Limburg, Liège and East Flanders. Special elections were held in the arrondissements of Antwerp, Brussels and Leuven.

Results

Chamber of Representatives

Constituencies
The distribution of seats among the electoral districts was as follows for the Chamber of Representatives, with the difference compared to the previous election due to population growth:

References

1860s elections in Belgium
General
Belgium
Belgium